Kaala is a 2017 Sri Lankan Sinhala epic fantasy film directed by Sujeewa Gunarathne and co-produced by director himself with Nadini Bamunusinghe for Live Works Creations. It stars Mahendra Perera and Madani Malwaththa in lead roles along with W. Jayasiri and Nita Fernando. Music composed by Darshana Ruwan Dssanayaka. It is the 1289th Sri Lankan film in the Sinhala cinema.

Plot
The film revolves around the time of King Dhatusena and the way he constructed Kala Wewa. It depicts the chronicles related to the tank and formation of new deity Kadawara.

Cast
 Mahendra Perera as Heen Kurutta Nilame
 Madani Malwaththa as Menika
 W. Jayasiri as Wattaka Nilame
 Achintha Kalana as Kaala
 Soorya Dayaruwan as Prince Kashyapa
 Nita Fernando as Henchman's mother
 Jagath Manuwarna as Wattaka's henchman
 Vishwanath Kodikara as Uththiya
 Chamari Nisansala
 Dayadeva Edirisinghe as King Dhatusena
 Janak Premalal as Heen Kurutta's brother
 Dharmapriya Dias as Wattaka's henchman
 Welegedara Ranasinghe

References

External links
අහෝ! කාල? දිය උදෙසා කළ හටන

2010s Sinhala-language films
2017 films